Novotel Warszawa Centrum is a skyscraper hotel in Warsaw, Poland.

History

The hotel was built in the 1970s during the period of the so-called People's Republic of Poland controlled by the Soviet Union. Following the modernization policy of the newly incumbent Edward Gierek the state-owned monopoly Orbis Hotels signed at the end of 1971 a contract with the Swedish company Skånska Cementgjuteriet for the construction of a luxurious hotel intended for foreign visitors. The 33 story building in the center of Warsaw, designed by Swedish architect Sten Samuelson at 111 meters was the second tallest building in Poland after the stalinist Palace of Culture and Science. Work was carried out at a record pace, with the hotel opened after just two years as hotel „Forum”, operated by the British company InterContinental. The buildings flat, rectangular shape with several rows of small windows and originally brown color earned it the nickname giant chocolate bar.

In 2000, the French Accor group bought a 20% stake in Orbis and the hotel was transferred to Accor's Novotel division in 2002 and renamed Novotel Warszawa Centrum. Between 2004 and 2005 the building underwent extensive modernization, bringing it up to modern standards and replacing its characteristic brown facade with a gray one common for Novotel.

See also
List of tallest buildings in Poland

References

External links

 
 Historic photos

Hotels in Warsaw
Skyscrapers in Warsaw
Skyscraper hotels in Poland
Hotels established in 1974
Hotel buildings completed in 1974
Buildings and structures completed in 1974